John Gibbs House may refer to:

John Gibbs House (Pilotview, Kentucky), listed on the NRHP in Clark County, Kentucky
John Gibbs House (Kalamazoo, Michigan), NRHP-ID 83000858

See also
 Gibbs House (disambiguation)
 John Gibbs (disambiguation)